Lashidan-e Motlaq (also Romanized as Lāshīdān-e Moţlaq) is a village in Rudboneh Rural District, Rudboneh District, Lahijan County, Gilan Province, Iran. At the 2006 census, its population was 2,647, in 734 families.

References 

Populated places in Lahijan County